Local elections were held in Romania on 5 June 2016.

Using a first past the post system, the following were contested: 
 All the commune, town, and city councils (Local Councils), and the Sectors Local Councils of Bucharest;
 The 41 County Councils, and the Bucharest Municipal General Council. The 41 Presidents of the County Councils will be indirectly elected by the County Councilors;
 All the mayors;
 Of the communes, cities, and municipalities;
 Of the Sectors of Bucharest;
 The General Mayor of The Municipality of Bucharest.

Results 

|-
|- style="background-color:#C9C9C9"
! style="background-color:#E9E9E9;text-align:center;" colspan=2 rowspan=2 | Party
! style="background-color:#E9E9E9;text-align:center;" colspan=3 | Mayor of Bucharest (PMB)
! style="background-color:#E9E9E9;text-align:center;" colspan=3 | Mayors (P)
! style="background-color:#E9E9E9;text-align:center;" colspan=3 | Local Councilsseats (CL)
! style="background-color:#E9E9E9;text-align:center;" colspan=3 | County Councilsseats (CJ)
|-
|- style="background-color:#C9C9C9"
! style="background-color:#E9E9E9;text-align:center;" |Votes
! style="background-color:#E9E9E9;text-align:center;" |%
! style="background-color:#E9E9E9;text-align:center;" |Seats
! style="background-color:#E9E9E9;text-align:center;" |Votes
! style="background-color:#E9E9E9;text-align:center;" |%
! style="background-color:#E9E9E9;text-align:center;" |Seats
! style="background-color:#E9E9E9;text-align:center;" |Votes
! style="background-color:#E9E9E9;text-align:center;" |%
! style="background-color:#E9E9E9;text-align:center;" |Seats
! style="background-color:#E9E9E9;text-align:center;" |Votes
! style="background-color:#E9E9E9;text-align:center;" |%
! style="background-color:#E9E9E9;text-align:center;" |Seats
|-
| 
| style="text-align:left;" | Social Democratic Party  ( - PSD)
| style="text-align:right;" | 246,553
| style="text-align:right;" | 42.97%
| style="text-align:right;" |  1
| style="text-align:right;" | 3,330,213
| style="text-align:right;" | 38.98%
| style="text-align:right;" | 1,708
| style="text-align:right;" | 3,161,046
| style="text-align:right;" | 37.70%
| style="text-align:right;" | 16,969
| style="text-align:right;" | 3,270,909
| style="text-align:right;" | 39.60%
| style="text-align:right;" | 638
|-
| 
| style="text-align:left;" | National Liberal Party  ( - PNL)
| style="text-align:right;" |  64,186
| style="text-align:right;" | 11.18%
| style="text-align:right;" |  -
| style="text-align:right;" |  2,686,099
| style="text-align:right;" | 31.50%
| style="text-align:right;" |  1,081
| style="text-align:right;" |  2,478,549
| style="text-align:right;" | 29.60%
| style="text-align:right;" |  13,198
| style="text-align:right;" |  2,529,986
| style="text-align:right;" | 30.64%
| style="text-align:right;" |  504
|-
| 
| style="text-align:left;" | Alliance of Liberals and Democrats ( - ALDE)
| style="text-align:right;" |   17,455
| style="text-align:right;" | 3.04%
| style="text-align:right;" |  -
| style="text-align:right;" |  488,145
| style="text-align:right;" | 5.72%
| style="text-align:right;" |   64
| style="text-align:right;" |  545,767
| style="text-align:right;" | 6.52%
| style="text-align:right;" |  2,504
| style="text-align:right;" |  521,845
| style="text-align:right;" | 6.32%
| style="text-align:right;" |  80
|-
| 
| style="text-align:left;" | Democratic Alliance of Hungarians in Romania  (- RMDSZ/UDMR)
| style="text-align:right;" |  -
| style="text-align:right;" |  -
| style="text-align:right;" |  -
| style="text-align:right;" |  315,236
| style="text-align:right;" | 3.69%
| style="text-align:right;" |  195
| style="text-align:right;" |  390,321
| style="text-align:right;" | 4.66%
| style="text-align:right;" |  2,284
| style="text-align:right;" |  411,823
| style="text-align:right;" | 4.98%
| style="text-align:right;" |  95
|-
| 
| style="text-align:left;" | People's Movement Party  ( - PMP)
| style="text-align:right;" |   37,098
| style="text-align:right;" |  6.46%
| style="text-align:right;" |  -
| style="text-align:right;" |   304,924
| style="text-align:right;" | 3.57%
| style="text-align:right;" |  18
| style="text-align:right;" |  360,035
| style="text-align:right;" | 4.30%
| style="text-align:right;" |  1,315
| style="text-align:right;" |  368,985
| style="text-align:right;" | 4.46%
| style="text-align:right;" |  41
|-
| 
| style="text-align:left;" | National Union for the Progress of Romania ( - UNPR)
| style="text-align:right;" |  -
| style="text-align:right;" |  -
| style="text-align:right;" |  -
| style="text-align:right;" |   213,233
| style="text-align:right;" | 2.50%
| style="text-align:right;" |  26
| style="text-align:right;" |  245,633
| style="text-align:right;" | 2.93%
| style="text-align:right;" |  1,203
| style="text-align:right;" |  220,467
| style="text-align:right;" | 2.67%
| style="text-align:right;" |  14
|-
| 
| style="text-align:left;" | Save Bucharest Union ( - USB)
| style="text-align:right;" |  175,119
| style="text-align:right;" | 30.52%
| style="text-align:right;" |  -
| style="text-align:right;" |  96,789
| style="text-align:right;" | 1.13%
| style="text-align:right;" |  -
| style="text-align:right;" |  121,099
| style="text-align:right;" | 1.44%
| style="text-align:right;" |  39
| style="text-align:right;" |  143,544
| style="text-align:right;" | 1.73%
| style="text-align:right;" |  15
|-
| 
| style="text-align:left;" | Romanian Social Party ( - PSRO)
| style="text-align:right;" |  -
| style="text-align:right;" |  -
| style="text-align:right;" |  -
| style="text-align:right;" |  100,303
| style="text-align:right;" | 1.17%
| style="text-align:right;" |  4
| style="text-align:right;" |  102,839
| style="text-align:right;" | 1.22%
| style="text-align:right;" |  318
| style="text-align:right;" |  99,587
| style="text-align:right;" | 1.20%
| style="text-align:right;" |  7
|-
| 
| style="text-align:left;" | Ecologist Party of Romania  ( - PER)
| style="text-align:right;" |  -
| style="text-align:right;" |  -
| style="text-align:right;" |  -
| style="text-align:right;" |  63,246
| style="text-align:right;" | 0.74%
| style="text-align:right;" |  1
| style="text-align:right;" |  87,016
| style="text-align:right;" | 1.03%
| style="text-align:right;" |  210
| style="text-align:right;" |  98,486
| style="text-align:right;" | 1.19%
| style="text-align:right;" |  8
|-
| style="background-color:" |
| style="text-align:left;" | United Romania Party ( - PRU)
| style="text-align:right;" |  8,356
| style="text-align:right;" |  1.45%
| style="text-align:right;" |  -
| style="text-align:right;" |  51,200
| style="text-align:right;" | 0.60%
| style="text-align:right;" |  2
| style="text-align:right;" |  60,494
| style="text-align:right;" | 0.17%
| style="text-align:right;" |  169
| style="text-align:right;" |  66,131
| style="text-align:right;" | 0.80%
| style="text-align:right;" |  -
|-
| 
| style="text-align:left;" | Independents 
| style="text-align:right;" |  10,639
| style="text-align:right;" | 1.85%
| style="text-align:right;" |  -
| style="text-align:right;" |  486,826
| style="text-align:right;" | 5.71%
| style="text-align:right;" |  53
| style="text-align:right;" |  258,538
| style="text-align:right;" | 3.08%
| style="text-align:right;" |  316
| style="text-align:right;" |  52,800
| style="text-align:right;" | 0.63%
| style="text-align:right;" |  3
|-
| 
| style="text-align:left;" | Democratic Forum of Germans in Romania  (- DFDR/FDGR)
| style="text-align:right;" |  -
| style="text-align:right;" |  -
| style="text-align:right;" |  -
| style="text-align:right;" |   40,348
| style="text-align:right;" | 0.47%
| style="text-align:right;" |  5
| style="text-align:right;" |  40,599
| style="text-align:right;" | 0.48%
| style="text-align:right;" |  81
| style="text-align:right;" |  42,652
| style="text-align:right;" | 0.51%
| style="text-align:right;" |  10
|-
| 
| style="text-align:left;" | Hungarian People's Party of Transylvania  (- EMNP/PPMT)
| style="text-align:right;" |  -
| style="text-align:right;" |  -
| style="text-align:right;" |  -
| style="text-align:right;" |   21,171
| style="text-align:right;" | 0.24%
| style="text-align:right;" |  -
| style="text-align:right;" |  35,019
| style="text-align:right;" | 0.41%
| style="text-align:right;" |  207
| style="text-align:right;" |  38,215
| style="text-align:right;" | 0.46%
| style="text-align:right;" |  6
|-
| style="background-color:#0000ff;" |
| style="text-align:left;" | Coalition for Baia Mare (FDGR-PNȚCD-PSRO-UNPR) ( - CBM)
| style="text-align:right;" |  -
| style="text-align:right;" |  -
| style="text-align:right;" |  -
| style="text-align:right;" |  32,111
| style="text-align:right;" | 0.37%
| style="text-align:right;" |  1
| style="text-align:right;" |  20,229
| style="text-align:right;" | 0.24%
| style="text-align:right;" |  11
| style="text-align:right;" |  26,217
| style="text-align:right;" | 0.31%
| style="text-align:right;" |  5
|-
| 
| style="text-align:left;" | Hungarian Civic Party  (- MPP/PCM)
| style="text-align:right;" |  -
| style="text-align:right;" |  -
| style="text-align:right;" |  -
| style="text-align:right;" |   19,355
| style="text-align:right;" | 0.22%
| style="text-align:right;" |  13
| style="text-align:right;" |  18,993
| style="text-align:right;" | 0.22%
| style="text-align:right;" |  158
| style="text-align:right;" |  16,824
| style="text-align:right;" | 0.20%
| style="text-align:right;" |  6
|-
| style="background-color:#900020;" |
| style="text-align:left;" | Party for Argeș and Muscel
| style="text-align:right;" |  -
| style="text-align:right;" |  -
| style="text-align:right;" |  -
| style="text-align:right;" |  14,625
| style="text-align:right;" | 0.17%
| style="text-align:right;" |  -
| style="text-align:right;" |  15,049
| style="text-align:right;" | 0.17%
| style="text-align:right;" |  67
| style="text-align:right;" |  14,137
| style="text-align:right;" | 0.17%
| style="text-align:right;" |  2
|-
| 
| style="text-align:left;" | Other political parties
| style="text-align:right;" |  14,369
| style="text-align:right;" |  2.48%
| style="text-align:right;" |  -
| style="text-align:right;" |   213,522
| style="text-align:right;" | 2.28%
| style="text-align:right;" |  15
| style="text-align:right;" |  368,927
| style="text-align:right;" | 4.63%
| style="text-align:right;" |  1,015
| style="text-align:right;" |  275,054
| style="text-align:right;" | 3.24%
| style="text-align:right;" |  -
|-
| style="text-align:left;" colspan = 2 | Total:
! style="text-align:right;" | 573,775
! style="text-align:right;" | 100
! style="text-align:right;" | 1
! style="text-align:right;" | 8,477,346
! style="text-align:right;" | 100
! style="text-align:right;" | 3,186
! style="text-align:right;" | 8,310,153
! style="text-align:right;" | 100
! style="text-align:right;" | 40,067
! style="text-align:right;" |  8,197,662
! style="text-align:right;" | 100
! style="text-align:right;" | 1,434
|}

Electoral maps

Notes

References 

Local election, 2016
2016 elections in Romania
June 2016 events in Romania